Palomino is the fifth studio album by Swedish country folk duo First Aid Kit. It is their first release since 2021's live album Who by Fire and their first studio project since Ruins in 2018. The album was released on 4 November 2022 via Columbia Records and was promoted by an extensive tour of the UK, Europe and North America.

Background
The album was announced on 22 June 2022 alongside the release of "Angel". Of the song, the band told NME "it feels special to release a song after such a long hiatus. Today we're so thrilled to finally share our new track 'Angel' – a hopeful tune for these crazy times about accepting other people even if you don't always see eye to eye. It's also about being kinder to yourself," they added. "We wanted it to feel really big, but vulnerable at the same time, something you can cry to and dance to as well." 

A second single from the album, "Out of My Head", was released on 12 August 2022. Speaking about the song, First Aid Kit stated "we wrote this song last year together with songwriter and producer Björn Yttling. It was the first time we wrote for First Aid Kit with someone else and it was very inspiring. The song was written in the spur of the moment, almost like a stream of consciousness. It's about feeling stuck inside your own thoughts and desperately wanting to escape. We produced the song with Daniel Bengtson in Stockholm. It has a bit of a different sound from our previous songs. We wanted the production to feel like an old rock song from the 80s. We were inspired by Fleetwood Mac, Kate Bush and Tom Petty. This is one of our favourite songs we've ever written, we're so proud of it and are so excited to finally get to share it."

"Turning Onto You" was released as the third single on 30 September 2022, with the band explaining in a statement "when recording this we wanted to achieve that old school 'country soul' sound. It was truly a team effort with an amazing brass section by Goran Kajfês and Per Johansson, a laid-back groove by Moussa Fadera, and killer George Harrison-slide guitar by Daniel Bengtson. Hope you like this one."

The fourth and final single from the album, "A Feeling That Never Came", was released on 21 October 2022. In a tweet about the song, First Aid Kit noted "just like the title suggests, 'A Feeling That Never Came' is a song about emptiness. Those times in your life when you expect to feel joy or sorrow, but instead you just feel numb. This was the last song we recorded for the album – originally intended more as a b-side, it has quickly become one of our favourites. We feel like the softer, quieter vocals married so well with the Marc Bolan-inspired guitars and groove. It's a soft quiet banger."

Track listing

Personnel
First Aid Kit
 Klara Söderberg – vocals, guitar, handclapping
 Johanna Söderberg – vocals, handclapping

Additional musicians

 Erik Arvinder – arranger, conductor
 Daniel Bengston – arranger, autoharp, engineer, guitar, handclapping, harp, harpsichord, juno, mellotron, mixing, percussion, piano, producer, strings, synthesizer, backing vocals, whistle, wurlitzer
 Willem Bleeker – string arrangements
 Claudia Bonfiglioli – violin
 Daniele Bonfiglioli – violin
 Daniel Crane – congas, drums, percussion, toms 
 Bard Ericson – double bass
 Mousa Fadera – drums, percussion
 Jannika Gustafsson – violin
 Pelle Hanson – cello
 Merit Hemmingson – organ
 Per "Texas" Johansson – flute, saxophone
 Goran Kajfes – trumpet
 Jakob Koranyi – cello
 Lisa Langbacka – accordion
 Ylva Larsdotter – violin
 Daniel Migdal – violin 
 Christopher Öhman	– viola
 Vicki Powell – viola
 Riikka Repo – viola
 Lisa Rydberg – violin
 Aleksander Sätterström – violin
 Amalie Stalheim – cello
 Anna Stefansson – violin
 Martin Stensson – violin
 Patrik Swedrup – violin
 Fredrik Syberg – violin
 Paul Waltman – violin
 Ylvali Zilliacus – viola

Technical
 Daniel Benston – production
 Eric Boulanger – engineering
 Tom Elmhirst – mixing, programming
 Adam Hong – mixing
 Niclas Lidström – engineering
 Simon Nordberg – mixing
 Chris Sorem – drum engineering

Artwork
 Olof Grind – photography
 Lisa Sander – artwork
 Emy Storey – design

Charts

References

2022 albums
Columbia Records albums
First Aid Kit (band) albums